Truckee is an incorporated town in Nevada County, California, United States. As of the 2010 United States Census, the population was 16,180, reflecting an increase of 2,316 from the 13,864 counted in the 2000 Census and having the 316th highest population in California and 2114th in the United States.

Name
Truckee's existence began in 1863 as Gray's Station, named for Joseph Gray's Roadhouse on the trans-Sierra wagon road. A blacksmith named Samuel S. Coburn was there almost from the beginning, and by 1866 the area was known as Coburn's Station. The Central Pacific Railroad selected Truckee as the name of its railroad station by August 1867, even though the tracks would not reach the station until a year later in 1868. It was renamed Truckee  after a Paiute chief, whose assumed Paiute name was Tru-ki-zo. He was the father of Chief Winnemucca and grandfather of Sarah Winnemucca. The first Europeans who came to cross the Sierra Nevada encountered his tribe. The friendly chief rode toward them yelling, “Tro-kay!”, which is Paiute for 'Everything is all right'. The unaware travelers assumed he was yelling his name. Chief Truckee later served as a guide for John C. Frémont.

History

Habitation by Native Americans

This water source formed a natural, seasonal route for Native Americans. Although no particular tribe is considered to have inhabited Truckee year-round, the Washoe people occupied a large territory roughly centered in the modern day Carson City area, but Shoshone and Paiute Tribes were also present (the Paiute Tribe Reservation now encompasses Pyramid Lake). These peoples are considered to be the primary source of Native American travelers in the area. Hobart Mills, just north of Truckee on Highway 89, has a large, horizontal, circular petroglyph of the type common to travel routes in Nevada. The date of that petroglyph, as well as several etched into granite slabs on the summit west of Truckee, are not agreed upon. But those artifacts, as well as the abundance of arrowheads throughout the Truckee region, attest to a minimum of hundreds of years of Native American presence. It is possible that, like the Shoshone, Ute people and earlier Fremont tribes of Utah and Eastern Nevada, the nearby Native American populations fluctuated over the course of millennia as a result of weather cycles, food source, and possibly disease or war. Some historians date the pre-Fremont culture of Eastern Nevada to as early as 10,000 B.C. and it's likely that the Eastern side of the Sierra Nevada mountains next to Truckee, since it faces the Great Basin, had Native Americans of a hunter-gatherer culture visit at least as early as 3,000 B.C. These people were probably of a purely nomadic group since datable housing structures like those found in Nevada and Utah are not present. Like most of the modern history of the West, as the European settlers' population increased, the Native American population decreased. The Gold Rush of 1849 caused a surge in fortune-seeking settlers (although Truckee itself wasn't settled until later). It is not known exactly when the last indigenous Native Americans passed through Truckee, but there is Washoe people oral history of the Donner Party tragedy of the winter of 1846–47.

Donner Party

The Donner Party ordeal is arguably Truckee's most famous historical event. In 1846, a group of settlers from Illinois, originally known as the Donner-Reed Party but now usually referred to as the Donner Party, became snowbound in early fall as a result of several trail mishaps, poor decision-making, and an early onset of winter that year. Choosing multiple times to take shortcuts to save distance compared to the traditional Oregon Trail, coupled with infighting, a disastrous crossing of the Utah salt flats, and the attempt to use the pass near the Truckee River (now Donner Pass) all caused delays in their journey.

Several attempts at carting their few remaining wagons, oxen, and supplies over the summit—sometimes by pulling them up by rope—proved impossible due to freezing conditions and a lack of any preexisting trail. The party returned, broken in spirit and short of supplies, to the edge of Donner Lake. A portion of the camp members also returned to the Alder Creek campsite a few miles to the east.

During the hard winter the travelers endured starvation and were later found to have practiced cannibalism. Fifteen members constructed makeshift snowshoes and set out for Sutter's Fort in the late fall but were thwarted by freezing weather and disorientation. Only seven survived: two were lost, and six died. Those who died were used as food by those who remained. The Truckee camp survivors were saved by a Reed Party member who had set out ahead after having been ejected from the party months earlier for killing another man in a violent argument. Seeing that the group never arrived at Sutter's Fort, he initiated several relief parties.

Of the original 87 settlers in the Donner-Reed party, 48 survived the ordeal. The Donner Memorial State Park is dedicated to the settlers and is located at the East End of Donner Lake.

Other historical events
Truckee grew as a railroad town originally named Coburn Station, starting with the Transcontinental Railroad. The railroad goes into downtown Truckee, and the Amtrak passenger lines still stop there on the trip from Chicago to San Francisco.

Truckee's Sinophobic movement had begun during the Reconstruction Period, marked by the Trout Creek Outrage of 1876:

By 1876, some 300 of the town’s residents, from workers to its most prominent citizens, had formed a local chapter of the Order of the Caucasians, also known as the Caucasian League, to drive out the Chinese. Truckee gained statewide notoriety that summer when late one night seven of the group's members, clad in black, surrounded and set fire to two cabins full of Chinese woodcutters who had refused to leave the area. The vigilantes shot at the Chinese men as they ran out of the cabin, killing forty-five-year-old Ah Ling.

Charles Fayette McGlashan, local lawyer and owner/publisher of the Truckee Republican, defended those accused in the Trout Creek Outrage and was a leader in the town's anti-Chinese movement. In 1886, the town's Chinese inhabitants, about 1,400 in number, were expelled from Truckee as part of a campaign that included a boycott of any business that did business with Chinese.

In 1891, Truckee's famous lawman, Jacob Teeter, was killed in a violent gunfight with fellow lawman, James Reed (no relation to James Frazier Reed of the Donner-Reed Party). Constable Reed was among those accused of participating in the Trout Creek Outrage fifteen years prior.

Truckee reportedly had one of the nation's first mechanized ski lifts at the site of the Hilltop Lodge. The historic Hilltop Lodge was converted to a restaurant in the 1940s by the Crandall Brothers, and eventually became Cottonwood Restaurant and Bar.  There were possibly two rope tows and a Poma lift, which was installed in 1954. At the same location there was a ski jump constructed during the early 1900s that was designed by Lars Haugen, a seven-time Olympic ski jumping champion.

Incorporation
In 1993, Truckee incorporated as a city.

Geography and climate

Truckee is located along Interstate 80 at  (39.342163, −120.203568).

Climate
Under the Köppen climate classification system, Truckee has either a cool-summer Mediterranean climate (Csb) or a dry-summer continental climate (Dsb), depending on which variant of the system is used. Winters are chilly with regular snowfall, while summers are warm to hot and dry, with occasional periods of intense thunderstorms. Its location near the Sierra Nevada crest at  provides conditions for winter storms to commonly deposit nearly a meter of snow in a 24-hour storm event and the occasional week-long storm event can deliver  of snow. The record maximum temperature of 104 °F (40 °C) was on July 6, 2007.

Demographics

2020
The 2020 US Census Reported that Truckee had a population of 16,729, an increase of 549 people since 2010.

2010
The 2010 United States Census reported that Truckee had a population of 16,180. The racial makeup of Truckee was 13,992 (86.5%) White, 3,016 (18.6%) Hispanic or Latino, 60 (0.4%) African American, 95 (0.6%) Native American, 241 (1.5%) Asian, 15 (0.1%) Pacific Islander, 1,431 (8.8%) from other races, and 346 (2.1%) from two or more races.

The Census reported that 16,137 people (99.7% of the population) lived in households, 43 (0.3%) lived in non-institutionalized group quarters, and 0 (0%) were institutionalized.

There were 6,343 households, out of which 2,135 (33.7%) had children under the age of 18 living in them, 3,443 (54.3%) were opposite-sex married couples living together, 411 (6.5%) had a female householder with no husband present, 314 (5.0%) had a male householder with no wife present.  There were 502 (7.9%) unmarried opposite-sex partnerships, and 43 (0.7%) same-sex married couples or partnerships. 1,382 households (21.8%) were made up of individuals, and 275 (4.3%) had someone living alone who was 65 years of age or older. The average household size was 2.54.  There were 4,168 families (65.7% of all households); the average family size was 2.98.

The population was spread out, with 3,769 people (23.3%) under the age of 18, 1,139 people (7.0%) aged 18 to 24, 5,030 people (31.1%) aged 25 to 44, 4,986 people (30.8%) aged 45 to 64, and 1,256 people (7.8%) who were 65 years of age or older.  The median age was 38.0 years. For every 100 females, there were 108.9 males.  For every 100 females age 18 and over, there were 111.3 males.

The homeowner vacancy rate was 3.3%; the rental vacancy rate was 7.8%.  10,783 people (66.6% of the population) lived in owner-occupied housing units and 5,354 people (33.1%) lived in rental housing units.

2000
As of the census of 2000, there were 13,864 people, 5,149 households, and 3,563 families residing in the town. The racial makeup of the town was 88.4% White, 0.3% African American, 0.6% Native American, 0.9% Asian, 0.2% Pacific Islander, 7.6% from other races, and 2.2% from two or more races. Hispanic or Latino of any race were 12.8% of the population.

There were 5,149 households, out of which 37.1% had children under the age of 18 living with them, 58.2% were married couples living together, 6.7% had a female householder with no husband present, and 30.8% were non-families. 18.7% of all households were made up of individuals, and 3.2% had someone living alone who was 65 years of age or older.  The average household size was 2.68 and the average family size was 3.09.

In the town, the population was spread out, with 26.7% under the age of 18, 7.0% from 18 to 24, 36.8% from 25 to 44, 24.0% from 45 to 64, and 5.5% who were 65 years of age or older.  The median age was 35 years. For every 100 females, there were 112.1 males.  For every 100 females age 18 and over, there were 112.0 males.

The median income for a household in the town was $58,848, and the median income for a family was $62,746. Males had a median income of $38,631 versus $29,536 for females. The per capita income for the town was $26,786.  About 2.8% of families and 4.6% of the population were below the poverty line, including 5.3% of those under age 18 and 2.0% of those age 65 or over.  Recent land clearing outside town limits may affect the population.

Transportation

Amtrak, the national passenger rail system, provides service to Truckee. The town's passenger rail station is located at 10065 Donner Pass Road in the historic downtown. Amtrak Train 5, the westbound California Zephyr, departs Truckee daily with service to Colfax, Roseville, Sacramento, Davis, Martinez, and Emeryville across the bay from San Francisco.  Amtrak Train 6, the eastbound California Zephyr, departs Truckee daily with service to Reno, Sparks, Winnemucca, Elko, Salt Lake City, Provo, Helper, Green River, Grand Junction, Glenwood Springs, Denver, Omaha, Galesburg, and Chicago. Capitol Corridor service from San Jose has been proposed, with the intention of going to Reno, Nevada. It is uncertain whether that extension may ever happen because there is only a single-track tunnel through the crest of the Sierra Nevada mountains at Norden, California. Traffic is heavy, often with trains waiting on either side to cross through, and therefore the Union Pacific railroad has said in the past that it is unlikely that Amtrak passenger rail travel will increase in frequency unless a second tunnel is built.

There is a free public bus, operated by neighboring Placer County, California; this connects the Truckee train station to the West Shore of Lake Tahoe, and a second goes to Incline Village, Nevada. There are also winter ski buses between Reno Airport and the ski areas near Truckee. Greyhound operates from the Amtrak rail station, going west to Sacramento and San Francisco, and east to Reno, Salt Lake City, and Denver. There are also private bus companies from the San Francisco Bay Area which bring skiers up to Truckee for day trips.

Interstate 80 passes just to the north of central Truckee. Essentially, it follows the old emigrant wagon route. State Route 89, a north–south highway, connects Truckee to the West Shore of Lake Tahoe.

The Truckee-Tahoe Airport provides access to the North Lake Tahoe recreational area through general aviation services. The airfield boasts a 7000-foot main runway and a 4600-foot crosswind runway. The airport is not serviced by any commercial airline at the present time, although commercial flights are available from the nearby Reno-Tahoe International Airport. There are also glider tours operated from the airport.

Government
The town is governed by a five-member Town Council, which elects one of its members as Mayor; the mayor presides over meetings and ceremonial events, but has no other special responsibilities.  The mayor as of December 2019 is David Polivy. The first mayor of Truckee was Kathleen Eagan.

State and federal representation

According to the California Secretary of State, as of February 10, 2019, Truckee has 9,910 registered voters. Of those, 4,336 (43.8%) are registered Democrats, 1,901 (19.2%) are registered Republicans, and 1,398 (14.1%) have declined to state a political party.

Education
There are no four-year universities in Truckee. The closest large universities are in Reno, Nevada, and Sacramento, California. The two-year Sierra College, headquartered in Rocklin, has its Tahoe-Truckee campus in town. Students can complete all the requirements for a two-year Associate of Arts degree at this campus, as well as various certificates, such as Accounting.

The Tahoe-Truckee Unified School District provides K-12 education to Truckee and the Lake Tahoe area with nine traditional schools, of which two elementary schools, a middle school, elementary school and Truckee High School are in the town itself. A newer middle school was recently built as well.

In interscholastic athletics, due to Truckee's isolation from the rest of California by the Sierra Nevada crest, Truckee High competes in the Nevada Interscholastic Activities Association along with four other similarly isolated California schools: North Tahoe High School, South Tahoe High School, Coleville High School, and Needles High School.

Notable people

 Krista Benjamin, poet and writer
 Alissa Bjerkhoel, litigation coordinator at the California Innocence Project (CIP)
 Win Butler, Canadian-American singer, songwriter, musician, and multi-instrumentalist
 Stacey Cook, World Cup alpine ski racer
 Kathleen Eagan, former mayor of Truckee
 Andy Finch, snowboarder
 Travis Ganong, World Cup alpine ski racer
 Chas Guldemond, snowboarder
 Jeff Hamilton, former World Speed Skiing Champion, 1992 Olympic Bronze Medal winner
 Peter Johnson, a former World Mogul Skiing champion
 Jeremy Jones, snowboarder
 Neel Kashkari, banker and politician
 Errol Kerr, downhill skier
 Ximena McGlashan, entomologist
 Debbie Meyer, former competition swimmer
 Daron Rahlves, a former World Skiing champion and Olympian
 Karly Shorr, snowboarder
 April Stewart, voice actress
 Marco Sullivan, former World Cup alpine ski racer
 Annika Taylor, cross-country skier
 Amy Westervelt, journalist
 Maia Wilkins, ballerina

References

Further reading
 
 Darabi, P., Sparksworthy, L. (2002). Women of Truckee making history: a collection of profiles of some of the exceptional and dedicated women in Truckee, California. Truckee: Dr. Homa Darabi Foundation.
 Hagaman, W. R. (2004). The Chinese must go!: the Anti-Chinese boycott, Truckee, California - 1886. Nevada City: The Cowboy Press.
 Meschery, Joanne (1978) Truckee: An Illustrated History of the Town and its Surroundings. Truckee: Rocking Stone Press.

External links

 

 
Cities in Nevada County, California
Populated places in the Sierra Nevada (United States)
Incorporated cities and towns in California
Populated places established in 1993
1993 establishments in California
Cities in Sacramento metropolitan area